You Can't Take It with You may refer to:

You Can't Take It with You (play), 1936 comedic play in three acts by George S. Kaufman and Moss Hart 
You Can't Take It with You (film), 1938 film based on the play, starring James Stewart
You Can't Take It with You (TV series), 1987 sitcom based on the play, starring Harry Morgan
You Can't Take It with You (album), 2009 album by As Tall as Lions
You Can't Take It With You, a BBC Radio 4 comedy series by Angela Barnes

See also
"Can't Take It with You", a song by Marah
"Can't Take It with You" (song), a song by Alan Parsons Project on Pyramid